Marina G. Zurkow (born December 19, 1962) is an American visual artist based in New York City who works with media technology, animation and video. Some of the less traditional mediums are known to be dinners, life science and bio materials. Her subject matter includes individual narratives, environmental concerns, and reflections on the relation between species, or between humans, animals, plants and the weather.  Her artworks have been seen in solo exhibitions at DiverseWorks in Houston Texas and at FACT in Liverpool. Zurkow is the recipient of a Creative Capital grant and has had fellowships from the Guggenheim and the Rockefeller Foundation.

Career

Zurkow currently resides in Brooklyn, New York. Her experience as a faculty member at NYU Tisch's Interactive Telecommunications Program coupled with her degree in Fine Arts have equipped her with a proper understanding of fine arts media, installation, video art, and semiotics. Her wide usage of "web work" began in the mid 1990s, where her work with animation, gif animation and Flash v1.0 was treated as more of a step up from her previous work with making "experimental videos, films and graphic design projects. In the last four years she has stuck to more of a rotoscoping technique, frame by frame on top of video, and well as a more standard cartooning of "squash and stretch, tweening of shapes, and purely invented behavioral cycles. She was an Eyebeam resident in 2009.

Works

Much of Zurkow's recent work is informed by both a sense of impending environmental catastrophe and a variety of art historical sources.  This includes the series "Crossing the Waters" (2006–2009), a collection of digital animations inspired by the threat of climate change.  The same concerns can be seen in the more recent series "Friends and Enemies" (2011-ongoing), which includes animations, prints (both digital and letterpress), and performances.  One work in the "Friends and Enemies" series is Mesocosm (Northumberland, UK) (2011), a 146-hour, black-and-white looping animation set in the titular location.

Zurkow has also incorporated both food and performance into recent works.  This includes "Outside the Work: A Tasting of Hydrocarbons and Geological Time" (2013), a performance/meal at Boston University's 808 Gallery and the Center for Energy and Environmental Research in the Human Sciences at Rice University, which used food as a means to prompt reflection on humanity's effect on the environment (particularly, in this case, relating to petroleum).

Additionally, Zurkow has also worked with several artists and other colleagues to collaborate on several projects. In 2006, she worked with Katie Salen and Nancy Nowacek, on the work, Karaoke Ice. Later on, in 2011, she also began work on a set of instructions for 2013, titled, Survival Challenges in collaboration with Ruth Ozeki, Oliver Kellhammer, Una Chaudhuri, Fritz Ertl, and a PTSD specialist.

References

External links
Official website

1962 births
Living people
Artists from New York (state)
Barnard College alumni
20th-century American artists
20th-century American women artists
21st-century American women artists
21st-century American artists
Rockefeller Fellows